Forbestra olivencia, the Olivencia tigerwing, is a species of butterfly of the family Nymphalidae. It is found in Brazil, Peru, and Ecuador.

Subspecies
F. o. olivencia (Brazil: Amazonas, Peru)
F. o. juntana (Haensch, 1903) (Ecuador)
F. o. oiticicai (d'Almeida, 1951) (Brazil: Pará)
F. o. aeneola Fox, 1967 (Peru)
F. o. truncata (Butler, 1867) (Brazil: Amazonas)

References

Butterflies described in 1862
Ithomiini
Arthropods of Brazil
Nymphalidae of South America
Taxa named by Henry Walter Bates